Anna Brüggemann (born 24 March 1981) is a German actress and screenwriter. She has appeared in more than sixty films since 1997.

Selected filmography

References

External links
 
 

1981 births
Living people
Actresses from Munich
German film actresses
German screenwriters
German women screenwriters
Film people from Munich
Silver Bear for Best Screenplay winners
21st-century German actresses